Pyrostephidae is a family of cnidarians belonging to the order Siphonophorae.

Genera:
 Bargmannia Totton, 1954
 Pyrostephos Moser, 1925

References

Physonectae
Cnidarian families